Isa Habibbayli is the President of the Azerbaijan National Academy of Sciences, Ph.D. in philology, professor, Honored Scientist of the Republic of Azerbaijan, a full member of ANAS.

Life 

Isa Habibbayli was born October 16, 1949 in Danzik village, Şərur district, Nakhchivan Autonomous Republic. He graduated with honors from Language-Literature Department of the Nakhchivan branch of the Azerbaijan State Pedagogical Institute.

He is the correspondent Member of Atatürk Institute for Culture, Language and History, member of the Union of Azerbaijani Writers and Union of Journalists and the honoured scientists of Azerbaijan. Isa Habibbayli worked as a teacher in a village secondary school in Şərur district since 1971, a lecturer, associate professor, vice-rector on scientific works in the Nakhchivan State University since 1975 and the rector of Nakhchivan State University from 1996 to 2013.

He is the vice-president of Azerbaijan National Academy of Sciences since April 2013.

He was the deputy of the Supreme Majlis of Nakhchivan Autonomous Republic and re-elected as Member of Parliament from Şərur Constituency No. 2. on November 6, 2005. Isa Habibbayli is a member of the Standing Commission of the Milli Mejlis on Science and Educational Issues. He is also a member of Azerbaijan-Belgium, Azerbaijan-United Arab Emirates, Azerbaijan-Pakistan, and Azerbaijan-Japan working groups on interparliamentary relations.  Isa Habibbayli is a member of the New Azerbaijan Party.

He is married and has three children.

Scientific activities 

He studied at the graduate degree of the Institute of Literature named after Nizami of ANAS (1974-1978). 
Professor Isa Habibbeyli is Ph.D. of philological sciences. He defended the candidate of XX century romantic lyrics of Azerbaijan and his doctoral thesis on J.Mammadguluzadeh: Environment and Contemporaries.

Isa Habibbayli is the corresponding member of the National Academy of Sciences since 2001 and an active member of the National Academy of Sciences since 2003. He is a member of the New York Academy of Sciences since 2001.

Isa Habibbayli is the active member of International Informatization Academy under United Nations. Isa Habibbayli is the author of more than 400 scientific articles, 12 monographs, 1 secondary school textbooks, 28 brochures. His works have been published in other languages such as English, French, Russian, Turkish, Persian, Urdu, Arabic, Bulgarian and Hungarian languages.

His research interests involves the history of Azerbaijan literature. He made international trips to the countries such as The United States, UK, China, France, Russia, Turkey, Germany, South Korea, Spain, Iran, Iraq, Bulgaria, Austria, Egypt, Tunisia, Ukraine, Pakistan, Hungary and some other countries and made scientific speeches on the conferences, international symposia and congresses.

Scientific performance indicators 
Isa Habibbayli is the author of 89 books, 1428 articles, 212 articles abroad. His works have been published in English, French, Russian, Turkish, Arabic, Persian, Urdu, Bulgarian, Hungarian, Lithuanian and other languages. He visited to US, UK, China, France, Russia, Turkey, Germany, South Korea, Spain, Iran, Iraq, Bulgaria, Austria, Egypt, Arabia, Tunisia, Ukraine, Pakistan, Hungary, Kazakhstan, Georgia, Mongolia and other countries, and attended many international scientific symposiums, congresses and conferences. He is the correspondent member of ANAS since  2001 and full member of ANAS since 2003.

Books 
His works include 12 monographs, 1 textbook, 2 textbooks, 18 brochures, 26 compilation books (total 89). 29 Candidates of Science, 4 PhDs.

Subject of candidacy (PhD) 
The romantic lyric of Azerbaijan in the early 20th century - 57.15.01 - Theory of Literature.

Doctoral thesis 
J.Mammadguluzadeh: his environment and contemporaries, 5716.01 - History of Azerbaijan Literature.

Major scientific achievements 
 Investigation of the stages and problems of Azerbaijani literature in XIX-XX centuries, Jalil Mammadguluzade, Mahammad Tagi Sidqi, Eynali bey Sultanov, Mohammad aga Shakhtakhtinsky and others heritage;
 Investigations of the theoretical problems and poetics of romance poetry; Concept of chronology and development stages of Azerbaijani literature; Theoretical investigations on satire; Actual problems of literary theory.

Other functions and honours 
 Vice President for Scientific Affairs of Nakhchivan State University (1991-1996); 
 Rector of Nakhchivan State University (1996-2013);
 Vice President of Azerbaijan National Academy of Sciences (since 2013);
 Director of the Institute of Literature named after Nizami Ganjavi of Azerbaijan National Academy of Sciences (since 2013).

Membership in scientific institutions 
His memberships in scientific institutions of the Republic of Azerbaijan and foreign countries include:
 Correspondent member of Atatürk Culture, Language and History Institute (1999);
 Member of the State Prize Commission of the Republic of Azerbaijan;
 Member of the World Azerbaijanis Coordinating Council (2001);
 Active member of the International Informatization Academy under the United Nations (2006);
 A member of the Editorial Board of the International Scientific Magazine published in Moscow (2008).

Social and political activities 
 Member of the Ali Majlis of Nakhchivan Autonomous Republic (1998-2005);
 Deputy of the Milli Mejlis of the Republic of Azerbaijan (since 2005);
 Chairman of the Milli Majlis's Science and Education Committee (since 2015);
 The chairman of the parliamentary commission on geographic names(since 2015);
 Member of the Political Council of the New Azerbaijan Party;
 Chairman of the Statutory Commission of the Azerbaijan National Academy of Sciences (since 2013);
 Editor-in-chief of the "News" magazine of ANAS;
 Editor-in-chief of "Literature magazine", "Poetika.izm", "Literary relations" magazines of Institute of Literature named after Nizami Ganjavi;
 Chairman of the Dissertation Council of the Institute of Literature named after Nizami Ganjavi of ANAS.

Awards 
 Honorary Decree of the Ministry of Education of the Republic of Azerbaijan;
 Honorary title of Honored Scientist of the Azerbaijan Republic;
 Honorary friend of Ankara University;
 Selected "Person of the Year" (2001) award by American Biographical Institute;
 The Turkish Republic Language Institution's "State Medal of Distinguished Service”;
 Shohrat Order (2007);
 Sharaf Order (2009);
 "Information Society Elite" diploma and "Head of Scientific Direction" medal of the International Informatization  Academy;
 Turkey Eurasia Culture and Art Association symbolic award (2009);
 Hussein Gazi Culture and Art Foundation Award (2009);
 Honorary Decree of the Supreme Assembly of Nakhchivan Autonomous Republic (2009);
 Honorary Decree of the Azerbaijan National Academy of Sciences (2009);
 "The head of the scientific direction of development of the Azerbaijani literature of the XIX-XX centuries and the modern scientific and artistic idea in Azerbaijan" award of International Informatization Academy (2009).

References

Academic staff of Nakhchivan State University
Living people
1949 births